Hurschler is a surname. Notable people with the surname include:

Andreas Hurschler (born 1977), Swiss Nordic combined skier
Seppi Hurschler (born 1983), Swiss Nordic combined skier
Walter Hurschler (born 1959), Swiss Nordic combined skier